Beharona is a town and commune in Madagascar. It belongs to the district of Manja, which is a part of Menabe Region. The population of the commune was estimated to be approximately 14,000 in 2001 commune census.

Only primary schooling is available. It is also a site of industrial-scale  mining. The majority 70% of the population of the commune are farmers, while an additional 30% receives their livelihood from raising livestock. The most important crop is rice, while other important products are maize, cassava and lima beans.

Nature
The Kirindy Mitea National Park is situated in this municipality together with its neighboring towns of Ankiliabo and Andranopasy.

Rivers
The Mangoky River and the Sakalava River.

Ethnics
The mayority of its population belong to the Sakalava tribe but also Betsileo, Antanosy and Merina live in this municipality.

References and notes 

Populated places in Menabe